"You're Easy on the Eyes" is a song co-written and recorded by Canadian country music artist Terri Clark. It was released in August 1998 as the second single from her CD, How I Feel, it spent three weeks at the top of the Billboard Hot Country Singles & Tracks (now Hot Country Songs) chart, giving Clark her first Number One single in the United States. It was written by Clark, Tom Shapiro and Chris Waters.

Music video
The music video was directed by Steven Goldmann.

Chart performance
"You're Easy on the Eyes" debuted at number 55 on the U.S. Billboard Hot Country Singles & Tracks for the week of August 29, 1998.

Year-end charts

References

1998 singles
1998 songs
Terri Clark songs
Songs written by Tom Shapiro
Songs written by Terri Clark
Songs written by Chris Waters
Song recordings produced by Keith Stegall
Mercury Records singles
Music videos directed by Steven Goldmann